John Foster or Forester (by 1508 – between 1547 and 1551), of Wellington, Shropshire, was an English politician.

Family
Foster was the son of John Foster of Wellington and his wife, Anne née Banester, a daughter of Thomas Banester of Hadnall. Foster was married twice: first to Alice née Charlton, a daughter of Thomas Charlton of Apley Castle, with whom he had one daughter. His second wife was Isabel née Lister, a daughter of William Lister of Rowton, Shropshire, with whom he had two sons.

Career
He was a patten-maker or a mercer. He was a Member (MP) of the Parliament of England for Much Wenlock in 1529.

References

Year of birth unknown
1551 deaths
English MPs 1529–1536
Politicians from Shropshire
Year of birth uncertain